The Chief of the Defence Staff of Italy is the service head of the Italian Armed Forces.

The current Chief of the Defence staff is Admiral Giuseppe Cavo Dragone.

History
The post was established in 1925 as Chief of the General Staff (Capo di Stato Maggiore Generale). From 1941 until 1945, it was Capo del Comando Supremo. In 1947 it assumed its present name.

The Chief of the Defense staff, since 1998, to exercise his duties, uses two joint bodies:
 Stato maggiore della Difesa (Defense Staff)
 Comando operativo di vertice interforze (Joint-top operational command)

List of chiefs of the defence staff

Kingdom of Italy (1925–1946)

Italian Republic (1945−present)

See also
Italian Armed Forces
Royal Italian Army
Italian Army
Chief of Staff of the Italian Army

Notes

References

External links

Chiefs of Defence Staff
Lists of Italian military personnel
Italy